General elections were held in Montserrat on 25 August 1987. The result was a victory for the People's Liberation Movement (PLM), which won four of the seven seats in the Legislative Council. PLM leader John Osborne remained Chief Minister.

Results

References

Elections in Montserrat
Montserrat
General election
Montserrat
Montserratian general election